The Boliniaceae are a family of fungi in the Boliniales order. The family consisted of seven genera and 40 species in 2008. A new study found more genera and species in 2020.

Genera
As accepted by Wijayawardene et al. 2020 (with amount of species per genus);

Apiocamarops  (4)
Apiorhynchostoma  (4)
Camaropella   (2) 
Camarops   (28) (includes Bolinia )  
Cornipulvina   (1)
Endoxyla   (3) 

Mollicamarops   (1) 
Neohypodiscus   (3) 
Pseudovalsaria   (3)

References

Ascomycota families
Boliniales